Merivälja (Estonian for "Sea Field") is a subdistrict in the district of Pirita, Tallinn, the capital of Estonia. It is located on the eastern coast of the Tallinn Bay, and is the northernmost subdistrict of Tallinn. Merivälja has a population of 3,088. It is the wealthiest subdistrict of the district of Pirita.

See also
Pirita Beach

Gallery

References

Subdistricts of Tallinn